Saint David is an administrative parish of Saint Vincent and the Grenadines, on the island of Saint Vincent. Its capital is Chateaubelair.

 Area: 80 km² (31 mi²)
 Population: 6,700 (2000 estimates)

Populated places
The following populated places are located within the parish of Saint David:

 Chateaubelair
 Richmond
 Richmond Vale
 Rosehall (Rose Hall)
 Troumaka
 Wallibou

References

External links

 Parishes of Saint Vincent and the Grenadines, Statoids.com

Parishes of Saint Vincent and the Grenadines